Air Marshal David Walker,  is a retired senior Royal Air Force officer. He was the Deputy Commander, Allied Joint Force Command at Brunssum in the Netherlands from 2011 to 2013, having previously served for over three years as Deputy Commander, Allied Air Component Command at Ramstein in Germany. Prior to that appointment he was Air Officer Commanding No. 1 Group in the United Kingdom.

Education and personal
Educated at Bristol University (Bachelor of Science in Geography) and King's College London (Master of Arts in Defence Studies), Walker undertook a Portal Fellowship for a Doctor of Philosophy with King's College London at the Royal Air Force College Cranwell.

RAF career
Walker was commissioned as a University Cadet in 1975, being regraded as a pilot officer on graduation in 1978, and then promoted to flying officer and flight lieutenant the following year. He completed flying tours in Germany, the United States, and the United Kingdom, flying the Harrier and F/A-18 Hornet, and promoted to squadron leader in 1987, and awarded the Air Force Cross in the following New Year Honours. Promoted to wing commander in 1993, Walker went on to command No. 1 Squadron, flying operational missions over Iraq and Bosnia, before becoming Military Assistant to the Minister of State for the Armed Forces, serving the Honourable Nicholas Soames and then Dr John Reid.

Walker was promoted to group captain in 1997, and attended the Higher Command and Staff Course in 1999, before taking command of RAF Cottesmore and the UK Harrier Force. In 2001 he was posted to HQ No. 3 Group, spending most of that tour deployed overseas supporting operations in Afghanistan as part of Operation Enduring Freedom; he was appointed Commander of the Order of the British Empire in the 2002 New Year Honours. Promoted to air commodore in 2002, he took up the post of Assistant Chief of Staff J3 (Operations) in the Permanent Joint Headquarters, with responsibility for the management of all United Kingdom expeditionary operations, but with his main focus being Operation Telic, the United Kingdom's contribution to the Iraq War.

Promoted to air vice marshal and appointed Assistant Chief of the Air Staff in October 2003, Walker became responsible for the detailed handling of overall RAF policy, relations with NATO and other allies and the change agenda, being closely involved in the Eurofighter Typhoon programme. In April 2005 Walker took command of No. 1 Group, with responsibility for the RAF's fast jet forces. In April 2006 he also assumed responsibility for the RAF Support Helicopter Force contribution to the UK Joint Helicopter Command.

In June 2007 Walker was promoted to air marshal and appointed Deputy Commander, Allied Air Component Command at Ramstein. In July 2010 he was appointed to co-lead the Joint US/NATO Ballistic Missile Defence Task Force, to develop Operational Concepts. Walker was appointed Companion of the Order of the Bath in the 2011 New Year Honours, and in March of that year he became Deputy Commander Allied Joint Force Command Brunssum.

References

Alumni of King's College London
Alumni of the University of Bristol
Commanders of the Order of the British Empire
Companions of the Order of the Bath
Living people
Recipients of the Air Force Cross (United Kingdom)
Royal Air Force air marshals
Royal Air Force personnel of the Iraq War
Royal Air Force personnel of the War in Afghanistan (2001–2021)
Year of birth missing (living people)